Robert E. Bellomini (June 1, 1925 – October 20, 1989) is a former Democratic member of the Pennsylvania House of Representatives.

References

Democratic Party members of the Pennsylvania House of Representatives
1989 deaths
1925 births
20th-century American politicians